Nixon is a surname of English, Scots, or Irish origin meaning "son of Nicholas". The following is a partial list of well-known persons and fictional characters with this name.

A–F
Agnes Nixon (1927–2016), American soap opera creator
Al Nixon (1886–1960), baseball player
Alfred Westland Nixon (1863–1921), Canadian physician and politician
Allan Nixon (1915–1995), American actor
Amy Nixon (born 1977), Canadian curler
Brad Nixon (born 1949), Canadian politician
Carl Nixon (born 1967), New Zealand author and playwright
Christine Nixon (born 1953), former Victorian (Australia) police commissioner
Colin Nixon (born 1978), Irish footballer
Cynthia Nixon (born 1966), American actress
Dale Nixon, a pseudonym used by several musicians
David Nixon (disambiguation), multiple people
Daviyon Nixon (born 1998), American football player
Derek Lee Nixon (born 1983), American actor
DeVaughn Nixon (born 1983), American actor
Donald A. Nixon (born 1950), nephew of President Richard Nixon
Donald Nixon (1914–1987), brother of President Richard Nixon
Donell Nixon (born 1961), baseball player
Drew Nixon (born 1959), American politician
E. D. Nixon (1899–1987), American civil rights activist
Edward Nixon (1930–2019), brother of President Richard Nixon
Edwin Nixon (1925–2008), British businessman, chief executive of IBM UK
Elmore Nixon (1933–1975), American blues pianist and singer
Eric Nixon (born 1962), English football goalkeeper
Francis Nixon (disambiguation), multiple people

G–L
 Gary Nixon (1941–2011), American motorcycle racer
 George Nixon (disambiguation), several people
 Gordon Nixon (born 1957), Canadian banker
 Hammie Nixon (1908–1984), American blues musician
 Hannah Milhous Nixon (1885–1967), mother of President Richard Nixon
 Harold Nixon (1909–1933), brother of President Richard Nixon
 Harry Nixon (1891–1961), Canadian politician
 Henry Nixon (born ), Australian actor
 Howard Nixon (1909–1983), British librarian
 James Nixon (disambiguation), several people
 Jay Nixon (born 1956), American politician, former Governor of Missouri
 Jeff Nixon (born 1956), American football player
 Jerren Nixon (born 1973), Trinidad and Tobago footballer
 Joan Lowery Nixon (1927–2003), American writer
 John Nixon (disambiguation), numerous people
 Joseph Nixon (1896–1977), English footballer
 Julie Nixon Eisenhower (born 1948), younger daughter of President Richard and Pat Nixon
 Kay Nixon Kathleen Irene Blundell née Nixon (1894–1988), English artist and illustrator
 Keisean Nixon (born 1997), American football player
 Kiden Nixon, fictional character from Marvel Comics
 Kimberley Nixon (born 1985), British actress
 Larry Nixon (born 1950), American professional fisherman
 Lewis Nixon (disambiguation), several people
 Livinia Nixon (born 1975), Australian actress
 Lucille Nixon (1908–1963), American poet who wrote in Japanese

M–Z
Marian Nixon (1904–1983), American movie actress born Marja Nissinen
Marmaduke Nixon (1814–1864), New Zealand politician and soldier
Marni Nixon (1930–2016), American singer
Matthew Nixon (born 1989), English golfer
Mike Nixon (1911–2000), American football player
Mojo Nixon (born 1957), American psychobilly musician
Nicholas Nixon (born 1947), American photographer
Nick Nixon (1939–2013), American country singer/songwriter
Norm Nixon (born 1955), American basketball player
Otis Nixon (born 1959), American baseball player
Pat Nixon (1912–1993), wife of President Richard Nixon
Paul Nixon (footballer) (born 1963), English-born New Zealand footballer
Paul Nixon (born 1970), English cricketer
Peter Nixon (born 1928), Australian politician
Phill Nixon (born 1956), English darts player
Richard Nixon (footballer) (1965–1992), Australian rules footballer
Richard Nixon (1913–1994), 37th president of the United States
Ricky Nixon (born 1963), Australian rules footballer
Robert Nixon (disambiguation), several people
Roger Nixon (1921–2009), American composer and musician
Ron Nixon, American journalist
Ronald Nixon (1898–1965), British-born Hindu spiritual teacher
Russ Nixon (1935-2016), American baseball player and manager
S. Frederick Nixon (1860–1905), American businessman and politician
Sam Nixon (born 1986), contestant on Pop Idol
Samuel A. Nixon (born 1958), American politician
Thomas Nixon (disambiguation), several people
Toby Nixon (born ), American politician
Tre Nixon (born 1998), American football player
Tricia Nixon Cox (born 1946), elder daughter to Richard and Pat Nixon
Trot Nixon (born 1974), American baseball player
Vivian Nixon (born 1984), American dancer
Walter Nixon (born 1928), American judge
Willard Nixon (1928–2000), American baseball player
William Penn Nixon (1832–1912), American publisher

Fictional characters
Bella Nixon, in the Australian soap opera Home and Away
Nick Nixon (Neighbours), in the Australian soap opera Neighbours
Samantha Nixon, in the British television series The Bill

See also
Nixon (disambiguation)
Nickson

References 

English-language surnames
Patronymic surnames
Surnames from given names